The 64th Directors Guild of America Awards, honoring the outstanding directorial achievements in films, documentary and television in 2011, were presented on January 28, 2012 at the Hollywood and Highland Center. The ceremony was hosted by Kelsey Grammer. The nominees for the feature film category were announced on January 9, 2012, the nominations for the television and commercial categories were announced on January 10, 2012, and the nominees for documentary directing were announced on January 12, 2012.

Winners and nominees

Film

Television

Commercials

Frank Capra Achievement Award
 Katy Garretson

Franklin J. Schaffner Achievement Award
 Dennis W. Mazzocco

Honorary Life Member
 Edwin Sherin

References

External links
  

Directors Guild of America Awards
2011 film awards
2011 television awards
2011 guild awards
Direct
Direct
2012 awards in the United States